Kamaluaganja is a residential area located within the municipal limits of Haldwani city in Uttarakhand, India, about 5 km from its city center. It existed as a separate village until December 2017, after which, its administration was handed over to the municipal corporation of Haldwani. It hosts two schools and a vocational training institute.

References 

Villages in Nainital district